Hans Schleuniger (born 9 July 1933) is a Swiss former professional racing cyclist. He rode in the 1960 Tour de France.

References

External links
 

1933 births
Living people
People from Zurzach District
Swiss male cyclists
Sportspeople from Aargau